The wedding of Princess Anne and Mark Phillips took place on Wednesday, 14 November 1973 at Westminster Abbey in London. Princess Anne is the only daughter and second child of Queen Elizabeth II and Prince Philip, Duke of Edinburgh, while Mark Phillips is a retired British Army cavalry officer and a skilled horseman and equestrian.

Engagement
Anne first met her future husband Mark Phillips at a party for horse lovers in 1968.  Both were competitive equestrians, with Anne winning the BBC Sports Personality of the Year award in 1971 after her victory at that year's European Eventing Championships, and Phillips winning a gold medal at the Olympic Games in 1972. Their engagement was announced on 29 May 1973. Phillips presented Anne with a Garrard engagement ring made from sapphire and diamond.

The wedding

The wedding day, which was on the twenty-fifth birthday of her older brother, Charles, Prince of Wales was declared a special bank holiday and a global estimated audience of 500 million watched the Westminster Abbey ceremony, with large crowds lining the streets on the wedding day. In the UK, 27.6 million people tuned in to watch the event. Although Phillips was technically a lieutenant in the Army at the time of the marriage, he was also an acting Captain and was styled as such. Princess Anne was accompanied to the ceremony in the Glass State Coach by her father, the Duke of Edinburgh. The Queen, The Queen Mother, The Prince of Wales, and Prince Andrew arrived in the Scottish State Coach. The ceremony featured many ceremonial aspects, including use of the state carriages and roles for the Household Cavalry, Irish Guards, and Coldstream Guards. A tall, iced wedding cake with silver tiers was prepared for the ceremony. Tiers of the cake were formed in the shape of a hexagon, and "a statue of a female jockey leaping a fence" was placed on top of it as a tribute to Anne's career as an equestrian.

The service was a traditional royal wedding conducted by Michael Ramsey, the Archbishop of Canterbury. In keeping with tradition, Anne's wedding ring was crafted from Welsh gold. The tradition of using Welsh gold within the wedding rings of the Royal Family dates back to 1923. Following the service, the couple then returned to Buckingham Palace for the traditional balcony appearance and a wedding lunch. At night, they stayed at White House Lodge in Richmond Park before going on their honeymoon on board the Royal Yacht Britannia, travelling the Atlantic and Pacific Oceans. The wedding ceremony was positively received by the public who gathered in the streets to celebrate the occasion. The BBC gained the rights to broadcast the event.

Clothing
Anne wore an "embroidered Tudor-style wedding dress, with a high collar and medieval -influenced sleeves". The dress was high-necked and high-waisted. It was designed by Maureen Baker, the chief designer for Susan Small. Anne wore a pair of diamond cluster earrings and her hair was "slightly parted up-do, with beehive volume." The Queen Mary Fringe Tiara secured her veil. Phillips wore the full dress uniform of his regiment, the Queen's Dragoon Guards.

Best man, bridesmaid and page boy
Capt. Eric Grounds served as the groom's best man. Princess Anne's bridesmaid was her nine-year-old cousin, Lady Sarah Armstrong-Jones, the daughter of Princess Margaret, while her page boy was her nine-year-old brother, Prince Edward.

Guests
1,500 guests attended the wedding, including:

British royal family
The Queen and The Duke of Edinburgh, the bride's parents
The Prince of Wales, the bride's brother
The Prince Andrew, the bride's brother
The Prince Edward, the bride's brother
Queen Elizabeth The Queen Mother, the bride's maternal grandmother
The Princess Margaret, Countess of Snowdon and The Earl of Snowdon,  the bride's maternal aunt and uncle
Viscount Linley, the bride's first cousin
Lady Sarah Armstrong-Jones, the bride's first cousin
The Duchess of Gloucester, the bride's maternal great-aunt by marriage
Prince and Princess Richard of Gloucester, the bride's first cousin once removed and his wife
The Duke and Duchess of Kent, the bride's first cousin once removed and his wife
The Earl of St Andrews, the bride's second cousin
Lady Helen Windsor, the bride's second cousin
Princess Alexandra, The Hon. Mrs. Ogilvy and The Hon. Angus Ogilvy, the bride's first cousin once removed and her husband
James Ogilvy, the bride's second cousin
Marina Ogilvy, the bride's second cousin
Prince Michael of Kent, the bride's first cousin once removed
Princess Alice, Countess of Athlone, the bride's first cousin thrice removed, and maternal great-great-aunt by marriage
The Earl Mountbatten of Burma, the bride's paternal great-uncle

Other royal guests
 The King and Queen of the Hellenes, the bride's second cousin and third cousin
 The Prince and Princess of Monaco
 Princess Beatrix and Prince Claus of the Netherlands (representing the Queen of the Netherlands)
 The Crown Prince and Crown Princess of Norway, the bride's second cousin once removed and his wife (representing the King of Norway)
 The Prince and Princess of Spain, the bride's third cousin once removed and second cousin
 Prince and Princess George William of Hanover, the bride's paternal uncle and aunt
 The Dowager Princess of Hohenlohe-Langenburg, the bride's paternal aunt
 Crown Prince Alexander of Yugoslavia, the bride's second cousin once removed

References

External links
 Order of Service for the wedding

Anne, Princess Royal, and Mark Phillips
1973 in London
Anne, Princess Royal
Anne, Princess Royal, and Mark Phillips
November 1973 events in the United Kingdom
Anne, Princess Royal, and Mark Phillips
1970s in the City of Westminster